The 2019 Fight for the Fallen was the inaugural Fight for the Fallen professional wrestling event produced by All Elite Wrestling (AEW). It took place on July 13, 2019, from Daily's Place in Jacksonville, Florida. Fight for the Fallen was held as a charity event to support victims of gun violence, a reference to the event's title. The special event was streamed for free on the B/R Live streaming service in North America and was available through pay-per-view internationally.

The card comprised nine matches, including two on the Buy In pre-show. In the main event, The Young Bucks (Matt Jackson and Nick Jackson) defeated The Brotherhood (Cody and Dustin Rhodes). Other prominent matches saw Kenny Omega defeat Cima and Adam Page defeat Kip Sabian.

Production

Background
All Elite Wrestling (AEW) was founded in January 2019. The company held its inaugural event, Double or Nothing, in May, followed by Fyter Fest in June. Fight for the Fallen was scheduled as AEW's third-ever event to be held on July 13, 2019 at Daily's Place in Jacksonville, Florida; Daily's Place would later become AEW's home base. It was scheduled to be held as a charity event in which all of the gate proceeds would be donated to victims of gun violence, a reference to the event's title. The following month on July 3, it was announced that the charity event would be sponsored by Farah & Farah, a personal injury law firm located in Jacksonville, and the proceeds from the gate would be donated to the Jacksonville Victim Assistance Advisory Council.

On July 9, Chris Jericho was announced as appearing in a non-wrestling role at the event. Fight for the Fallen was streamed for free on the B/R Live streaming service in North America, and was available through pay-per-view internationally.

Storylines 
Fight for the Fallen comprised nine professional wrestling matches, including two on the pre-show, that involved different wrestlers from pre-existing scripted feuds and storylines. Wrestlers portrayed heroes, villains, or less distinguishable characters in scripted events that built tension and culminated in a wrestling match or series of matches. Storylines were produced on The Young Bucks' YouTube series Being The Elite and Cody's Nightmare Family YouTube series The Road to Fight for the Fallen.

At Double or Nothing after Cody had defeated his brother Dustin Rhodes, he said that as an Executive Vice President of AEW, he had scheduled himself to have a tag team match against The Young Bucks (Matt Jackson and Nick Jackson) at Fight for the Fallen. He said that he did not need just any partner, he needed his brother, to which Cody and Dustin embraced, confirming that The Young Bucks would face The Brotherhood (Cody and Dustin) at the event.

Just prior to the event, it was announced that The Dark Order (Evil Uno and Stu Grayson), Angélico and Jack Evans, and Jungle Boy and Luchasaurus would face off in a three-way tag team match at Fight for the Fallen with the winning team advancing to All Out on August 31 for an opportunity at a first round bye in the AEW World Tag Team Championship tournament.

Event

The Buy In 
Two matches occurred during the Buy In. In the first, Sonny Kiss faced Peter Avalon. Kiss performed a Split-Legged Leg Drop on Avalon to win.

In the second, Bea Priestley and Shoko Nakajima faced Dr. Britt Baker, D.M.D. and Riho. Nakajima pinned Riho with a roll up to win.

Preliminary matches 
The event opened with MJF, Sammy Guevara, and Shawn Spears facing Darby Allin, Jimmy Havoc, and Joey Janela. Spears performed a Death Valley Driver on Allin to win.

Next, Brandi Rhodes (accompanied by Awesome Kong) faced Allie. Brandi performed a Spear on Allie to win. After the match, Awesome Kong was confronted by Aja Kong.

After that, The Dark Order (Evil Uno and Stu Grayson), Angélico and Jack Evans, and A Boy and His Dinosaur (Jungle Boy and Luchasaurus) competed to advance to All Out for an opportunity at a first round bye in the AEW World Tag Team Championship tournament. Grayson and Uno performed Fatality on Jungle Boy to win.

Later, Adam Page faced Kip Sabian. Page performed a Dead Eye on Sabian to win. After the match, a disguised Chris Jericho appeared and performed a Codebreaker and a Judas Effect on Page.

In the fifth match, AAA World Tag Team Champions Lucha Brothers (Pentagon Jr and Rey Fenix) faced SoCal Uncensored (Kazarian and Scorpio Sky) in a non-title match. Pentagon and Fenix performed a Fear Factor/Diving Double Foot Stomp combination on Sky to win. After the match, Pentagon and Fenix struck Christopher Daniels, Kazarian, and Sky with a ladder. Pentagon and Fenix then challenged The Young Bucks (Matt Jackson and Nick Jackson) to a ladder match with their AAA World Tag Team Championship on the line at All Out.

In the penultimate match, Kenny Omega faced Cima. Omega performed a One-Winged Angel on Cima to win.

Chris Jericho cut a promo, proclaiming he would defeat Adam Page for the inaugural AEW World Championship at All Out. Page appeared and attacked Jericho. Officials separated Jericho and Page.

Main event 
In the main event, The Young Bucks (Matt and Nick Jackson) faced The Brotherhood (Cody and Dustin Rhodes). Cody and Dustin simultaneously performed Shatter Dreams and Final Cuts on Matt and Nick for a near-fall. Nick performed Cross Rhodes on Cody and Matt scored a near-fall. Matt and Nick performed a Meltzer Driver on Cody to win.

Reception 
Jason Powell of Pro Wrestling Dot Net described Fight for the Fallen as overall "a good show", although he thought that many matches suffered a bit for going long, and he felt that fatigue set in with a crowd that had been in the heat for over four hours.

Results

See also
2019 in professional wrestling 
List of All Elite Wrestling pay-per-view events

References

External links

2019
2019 All Elite Wrestling pay-per-view events
2019 in professional wrestling in Florida
Events in Jacksonville, Florida
June 2019 events in the United States
Professional wrestling in Jacksonville, Florida